The 2011–12 season was Brechin City's sixth consecutive season in the Scottish Second Division, having been relegated from the Scottish First Division at the end of the 2005–06 season. Brechin also competed in the Challenge Cup, League Cup and the Scottish Cup.

Summary
Brechin finished eighth in the Second Division. They reached the first round of the Challenge Cup, the first round of the League Cup and the fourth round of the Scottish Cup.

Results & fixtures

Second Division

Scottish Cup

Challenge Cup

League Cup

Player statistics

Squad 
Last updated 5 May 2012 

 

   

|}

Disciplinary Record 

Includes all competitive matches.

Last updated 5 May 2012

Awards

Last updated 30 January 2012

Team statistics

League table

Transfers

Players in

Players out

References

Brechin City F.C. seasons
Brechin City